The 2012–13 Wake Forest Demon Deacons men's basketball team represented Wake Forest University during the 2012–13 NCAA Division I men's basketball season. Their head coach was Jeff Bzdelik, who was coaching in his third season at Wake Forest. The team played its home games at the Lawrence Joel Veterans Memorial Coliseum in Winston-Salem, North Carolina, and was a member of the Atlantic Coast Conference. They finished the season 13–18, 6–12 in ACC play to finish in a tie for ninth place. They lost in the first round of the ACC tournament to Maryland.

Previous season
Wake finished the 2011–12 season 13–18, 4–12 in ACC play tied for 9th place and lost in the first round of the ACC tournament. The end of the season was highlighted by the sudden outgoing transfer of 3 players off the Wake Forest Men's Basketball team following Athletic Director Ron Wellman's announcement that Head Coach Jeff Bzdelik would be returning for another season.

Recruiting
Wake Forest has a 7-man recruiting class for 2012.

Roster

Schedule

|-
!colspan=9| Exhibition

|-
!colspan=9| Regular season

|-
!colspan=9| ACC tournament

|-

Leaders by Game

 Team Season Highs in Bold.

References

Wake Forest Demon Deacons men's basketball seasons
Wake Forest